Casillas de Flores is a village and municipality in the province of Salamanca, western Spain, part of the autonomous community of Castile-Leon.

History
The village was founded by Alfonso VI in about 1650.   It is known for its position on a smuggling route connecting Spain to Portugal.  During the 1960s many of the residents emigrated to (then) more economically dynamic places such as France, Switzerland and the Basque country.

References

Municipalities in the Province of Salamanca